Ovwian is a town in the Udu Clan, Delta State, Nigeria. Its population is over 20,000,000. Ovwian shares boundaries with Aladja, Ekete, Owhase, Egini, Orhuwhorun and Ujevwu communities. Ovwian is the biggest town in the Udu Local Government area.

Government 

An elected president rules over the town. The current President General is Chief Hon. Amb. Matthew Uparan and the secretary general is Mr. Duke Okwa, Mr. Abraham Osimini is the immediate past secretary general.

Religion 

Christianity is the most practiced religion.

Subdivisions 

Ovwian is divided into urban and rural areas. The rural Ovwian has seven quarters namely Ekrimowhe quarter, Uduvwurhie quarter, Uduvwogba(Ozimi) quarter, Uduvwota quarter, Ekrata quarter, Ekregworhor quarter and Uduvweyara quarter.

Geography 

The Udu River runs through Ovwian before merging into the Warri River.

Education 

Ovwian primary school, Etako primary school, Emoghene school, Jesu primary school are public schools located inside the town, while Ovwian secondary school is in the outskirts leading to Ujevwu. Numerous private schools operate there.

Economy 

Most of the people are either steel workers, fishermen, hunters or farmers, businessmen/women or traders.

Delta Steel Company has plant facilities located there. The Niger Benue Transport Company Limited (NBTC) operates at the outskirts of Ekrimowho quarter.

Ovwian has three major markets: Ovwian Main Market is located in the middle of town. Udu Main Market and Udu Harbour Market are located along Udu Bridge and Road respectively. A private market called Jigbale is owned by the Great Jigbale family.

Populated places in Delta State